Nikodim I of Peć and Nikodim of Hilandar was a monk-scribe at Hilandar before becoming the 10th Serbian Archbishop from 1316 to 1324, he died in the year 1325. He is a Serbian saint and the Eastern Orthodox Church celebrates his feast day on May 11/24. Nikodim is the author of Rodoslov: srpskih kraljeva i vladika (The Lives of Serbian Kings and Bishops).

Life 
In 1314, heir apparent Stefan Uroš III was exiled to Constantinople after quarrels with his father, king Stefan Milutin. In 1317, Uroš III asked Nikodim to intervene between him and his father. Nikodim's autobiographical note was inscribed in a manuscript entitled "A Visit to Constantinople" in the year 1318 and 1319. In 1320, Milutin allowed Uroš III to return upon the persuasion of Nikodim. Stefan Konstantin, Uroš's half-brother and heir to the throne, was crowned king upon the death of Milutin in 1321. Civil war erupted when Konstantin refused to submit to Uroš III, who then invaded Zeta, and in the ensuing battle, Konstantin was killed. After the victory, on January 6, 1322, Nikodim crowned Uroš King and Dušan Young King.

While he was the Abbot of his alma mater Hilandar, Nikodim requested that a certain protos (monk-priests) of Mt. Athos by the name of Theophanes issues an edict (gramma) wherein he grants to the monks of the Kelion of Saint Sava in Karyes, Mount Athos, a piece of land and an abandoned monastery. With the statement of the month, indiction, year, and the signatures of the Protos and the witnesses. Although the language is coarse and abounds in solecisms and "barbarisms", making it difficult to read, it was copied in skilled handwriting.

He co-founded 14th century Serbian Orthodox Vratna monastery alongside Serbian king Stefan Milutin (1282–1321) of the Nemanjić dynasty.

See also
 Teodosije the Hilandarian (1246-1328), one of the most important Serbian writers in the Middle Ages
 Elder Grigorije (fl. 1310-1355), builder of Saint Archangels Monastery
 Antonije Bagaš (fl. 1356-1366), bought and restored the Agiou Pavlou monastery
 Lazar the Hilandarian (fl. 1404), the first known Serbian and Russian watchmaker
 Pachomius the Serb (fl. 1440s-1484), hagiographer of the Russian Church
 Miroslav Gospel
 Gabriel the Hilandarian
 Constantine of Kostenets
 Cyprian, Metropolitan of Kiev and All Rus'
 Gregory Tsamblak
 Isaija the Monk
 Grigorije of Gornjak
 Rajčin Sudić
 Jakov of Serres
 Romylos of Vidin
 Atanasije (scribe)
 Domentijan

References

Sources

External links

1325 deaths
14th-century Christian saints
14th-century Eastern Orthodox bishops
14th-century Serbian people
Serbian saints of the Eastern Orthodox Church
Archbishops of Serbs
Year of birth unknown
Burials at the Patriarchate of Peć (monastery)